Alain Fousseret (25 March 1956 – 6 December 2022) was a French politician and one of ten vice presidents of the Franche-Comté Regional Council. He won the nomination to be the next Greens and Europe Écologie candidate for President of Franche-Comté in 2010.

Alain Fousseret was the brother of Jean-Louis Fousseret, the former Socialist mayor of Besançon. He died on 6 December 2022, at the age of 66.

References

Sources 
Franche-Comté Regional Council : La Présidente et son Bureau (in French)

|-

|-

1956 births
2022 deaths
Franche-Comté Regional Councillors
Politicians from Besançon
The Greens (France) politicians